Rony Hanselmann (born 25 June 1991) is a former Liechtensteiner footballer who last played for FC Balzers.

Career
Hanselmann began his youth career with FC Triesenberg and moved onto FC Balzers in 2009.

International career
He was a member of the Liechtenstein national under-21 football team and had 12 caps and one goal. Hanselmann received his first call-up to the senior team for the UEFA Euro 2012 qualifying match against Spain on 3 September 2010 and made his debut as a substitute versus the Czech Republic on 12 October 2010.

References

1991 births
Living people
Liechtenstein footballers
FC Balzers players
Association football midfielders
Liechtenstein international footballers